The 2019–20 Formosa Dreamers season was the franchise's 3rd season, its third season in the ASEAN Basketball League (ABL), its 3rd in Changhua County. The Dreamers are coached by Kyle Julius in his first year as head coach. The Dreamers play their home games at Changhua County Stadium.

Standings

Roster

Game log

Hualien Probation Basketball

Group stage

7th place

MABA International Basketball Invitation

Regular season 

|-style="background:#fcc;"
| 1
| November 23
| @Vampire
| L 90-95
| Marcus Keene (22)
| Jerran Young (18)
| Marcus Keene (6)
| Stadium 29
| 0-1

|-style="background:#fcc;"
| 2
| December 1
| Black Bears
| L 85-91
| Marcus Keene (28)
| Jerran Young (12)
| Marcus Keene (12)
| Changhua County Stadium
| 0-2
|-style="background:#fcc;"
| 3
| December 7
| Braves
| L 81-90
| Marcus Keene (22)
| Jerran Young (15)
| Marcus Keene (8)
| Changhua County Stadium
| 0-3
|-style="background:#cfc;"
| 4
| December 8
| Black Bears
| W 100-94
| Marcus Keene (29)
| Liam McMorrow (13)
| Marcus Keene (10)
| Changhua County Stadium
| 1-3
|-style="background:#ccc;"
| PPD
| December 14
| @Wolf Warriors
| colspan=6|Postponed
|-style="background:#cfc;"
| 5
| December 21
| Braves
| W 88-80
| Anthony Tucker (25)
| Jerran Young (16)
| Anthony Tucker (9)
| Changhua County Stadium
| 2-3
|-style="background:#fcc;"
| 6
| December 22
| Alab
| L 99-100
| Jordan Tolbert (25)
| Jerran Young (12)
| Anthony Tucker (11)
| Changhua County Stadium
| 2-4

|-style="background:#fcc;"
| 7
| January 3
| @Braves
| L 76-83
| Jerran Young (25)
| Jerran Young (14)
| Jerran Young (6)
| Taipei Heping Basketball Gymnasium
| 2-5
|-style="background:#cfc;"
| 8
| January 5
| Slingers
| W 88-77
| Jerran Young (21)
| Jordan Tolbert (14)
| Anthony Tucker (7)
| Changhua County Stadium
| 3-5
|-style="background:#cfc;"
| 9
| January 8
| @Wolf Warriors
| W 92-89
| Jerran Young (23)
| Jerran Young (22)
| Anthony Tucker (11)
| Zhongshan Shaxi Gymnasium
| 4-5
|-style="background:#cfc;"
| 10
| January 10
| @Wolf Warriors
| W 100-89
| Anthony Tucker (31)
| Jordan Tolbert (7)
| Anthony Tucker (13)
| Zhongshan Shaxi Gymnasium
| 5-5
|-style="background:#fcc;"
| 11
| January 12
| @Dragons
| L 79-80
| Jerran Young (25)
| Jerran Young (12)
| Anthony Tucker (5)
| MABA Stadium
| 5-6
|-style="background:#cfc;"
| 12
| January 18
| @Heat
| W 95-65
| Jerran Young (30)
| Jerran Young (17)
| Anthony Tucker (6)
| CIS Arena
| 6-6

|-style="background:#cfc;"
| 13
| February 1
| Dragons
| W 85-79
| Anthony Tucker (22)
| Jerran Young (16)
| Anthony Tucker (8)
| Changhua County Stadium
| 7-6
|-style="background:#cfc;"
| 14
| February 2
| Heat
| W 89-80
| Anthony Tucker (30)
| Jerran Young (19)
| Jerran Young (6)
| Changhua County Stadium
| 8-6
|-style="background:#ccc;"
| PPD
| February 8
| Eastern
| colspan=6|Postponed
|-style="background:#ccc;"
| PPD
| February 9
| Eastern
| colspan=6|Postponed
|-style="background:#ccc;"
| PPD
| February 19
| @Eastern
| colspan=6|Postponed
|-style="background:#ccc;"
| PPD
| February 22
| Wolf Warriors
| colspan=6|Postponed
|-style="background:#ccc;"
| PPD
| February 23
| Wolf Warriors
| colspan=6|Postponed

|-style="background:#ccc;"
| PPD
| March 1
| @Slingers
| colspan=6|Postponed
|-style="background:#ccc;"
| PPD
| March 7
| @Braves
| colspan=6|Postponed
|-style="background:#ccc;"
| PPD
| March 14
| Vampire
| colspan=6|Postponed
|-style="background:#ccc;"
| PPD
| March 22
| @Alab
| colspan=6|Postponed
|-style="background:#ccc;"
| PPD
| March 25
| @Eastern
| colspan=6|Postponed
|-style="background:#ccc;"
| PPD
| March 27
| @Black Bears
| colspan=6|Postponed
|-style="background:#ccc;"
| PPD
| March 29
| @Black Bears
| colspan=6|Postponed

Player Statistics 
<noinclude>

 Reference：
‡ Waived during the season
≠ Acquired during the season

Transactions

Overview

Free Agency

Additions

Subtractions

Awards

Players of the Week

References 

Formosa Dreamers seasons
Formosa Dreamers Season, 2019-20